USS LST-33 was an  of the United States Navy built during World War II. She was transferred to the Royal Hellenic Navy on 18 August 1943, before being commissioned into the USN, and was renamed Samos (Σάμος).

Construction 
LST-33 was laid down on 23 February 1943, at Pittsburgh, Pennsylvania by the Dravo Corporation; launched on 21 June 1943; sponsored by Mrs. Paul J. Walsh; and transferred to the Royal Hellenic Navy on 18 August 1943, and renamed Samos (L179). Her commander was Captain Pyrros Lappas.

Service history 
Samos, ex-LST-33, sailed from Galveston Bar for Key West, Florida, on 28 August 1943, with convoy HK 125, arriving in Key West, 1 September 1943.

On 11 October 1943, Samos left Halifax, Nova Scotia, in convoy SC 144, en route she joined convoy WN 497 that had departed Loch Ewe, on 26 October. She arrived in Methil, Scotland, on 28 October with a load of lumber.

Samos departed Methil, on 3 December 1943, in convoy EN 314 (series 2), arriving in Loch Ewe, on 5 December. She departed Liverpool, England, in convoy OS 61/KMS 35, on 8 December 1943. The convoy split on 19 December, with Samos continuing on in convoy KMS 35G, arriving in Gibraltar, on 21 December.

She sailed out of Taranto, Italy, in convoy HP 1, on 24 October 1944, arriving in Piraeus, Greece, on 27 October 1944.

Her last recorded convoy was from New York City, on 2 March 1945, in convoy NG 493, arriving in Guantánamo Bay, Cuba, on 9 March 1945.

Post-war service
She was sold to the government of Greece in January 1947. She was struck from the Navy list on 23 June 1947. She served in the Greek navy until being decommissioned on 25 September 1977.

References

Bibliography

External links
 
 Σάμος L-179 (1943-1977) , Hellenic Navy website

 

1943 ships
Ships built in Pittsburgh
LST-1-class tank landing ships of the Hellenic Navy
World War II amphibious warfare vessels of Greece
Ships built by Dravo Corporation